Chourgnac is a commune in the Dordogne department in Nouvelle-Aquitaine in southwestern France.

Population

Notable people
 Orelie-Antoine de Tounens, “King of Araucania and Patagonia”

See also
Communes of the Dordogne department

References

Communes of Dordogne